Thomas Sell (1800 – 1844) was an English cricketer who was associated with Cambridge Town Club and made his first-class debut in 1827.

References

1800 births
1844 deaths
English cricketers
English cricketers of 1826 to 1863
Cambridge Town Club cricketers